Choline-phosphate cytidylyltransferase B is an enzyme that in humans is encoded by the PCYT1B gene.

References

Further reading